The following are the Pulitzer Prizes for 1951.

Journalism awards

Public Service:
The Miami Herald and the Brooklyn Eagle, for their reporting on organized crime during the year.
Local Reporting:
 Edward S. Montgomery of the  San Francisco Examiner, for his series of articles on tax frauds which culminated in an exposé within the Bureau of Internal Revenue.
National Reporting:
 No award given.
International Reporting:
 Keyes Beech (Chicago Daily News); Homer Bigart (New York Herald Tribune); Marguerite Higgins (New York Herald Tribune); Relman Morin (AP); Fred Sparks (Chicago Daily News); and Don Whitehead (AP), for their reporting of the Korean War.
Editorial Writing:
 William Harry Fitzpatrick of the New Orleans States, for his series of editorials analyzing and clarifying a very important constitutional issue, which is described by the general heading of the series, "Government by Treaty".
Editorial Cartooning:
Reginald W. Manning of The Arizona Republic, for "Hats".
Photography:
 Max Desfor of the Associated Press, for his photographic coverage of the Korean War, an outstanding example of which is, "Flight of Refugees Across Wrecked Bridge in Korea".
Special Citations:
Cyrus L. Sulzberger of The New York Times, for his exclusive interview with Archbishop Aloysius Stepinac.
Arthur Krock of The New York Times, for his exclusive interview with President Truman. As a member of the Advisory Board of the Pulitzer Prizes, Krock was ineligible for a prize, under the Board's policy. His interview was cited as the outstanding example of national reporting for the year, in lieu of awarding the National Reporting prize to anyone.

Letters, Drama and Music Awards

Fiction:
 The Town by Conrad Richter (Knopf).
Drama:
 No award given.
History:
 The Old Northwest, Pioneer Period 1815-1840 by R. Carlyle Buley (Indiana Univ. Press).
Biography or Autobiography:
 John C. Calhoun: American Portrait by Margaret Louise Coit (Houghton).
Poetry:
 Complete Poems by Carl Sandburg (Harcourt).
Music:
 Music in Giants in the Earth by Douglas Stuart Moore (Circle Blue), produced by Columbia Opera Workshop, March 28, 1951.

References

External links
Pulitzer Prizes for 1951

Pulitzer Prizes by year
Pulitzer Prize
Pulitzer Prize